Horistus orientalis is a  species of plant bugs, part of the suborder Heteroptera (also called "true bugs"), which belongs to the family Miridae, subfamily Mirinae.

Distribution
This species can be found in most of continental Europe. These bugs primarily inhabit wet meadows 	and meadows.

Description

Biology
Adults can be seen from May to August. These polyphagous bugs mainly feed on nectar and juices of Glechoma hederacea, Achillea millefolium, Angelica sylvestris, Galium, Senecio and Bromus species.

References

External links
 Biolib

Hemiptera of Europe
Insects described in 1790
Taxa named by Johann Friedrich Gmelin
Mirini